Eungella Hinterland is a rural locality in the Mackay Region, Queensland, Australia.

Geography 
Eungella Hinterland is mountainous undeveloped terrain with individual peaks including Mount William , Mount David , and Mount Dalrymple .

The eastern half of the locality is a protected area, involving the Macartney State Forest, Eungella National Park, Pelion Forest Reserve and Pelion State Forest.

History 
The locality takes its name from the town and pastoral run name, which in turn was named in July 1876 by explorer Ernest Favenc in July 1876. It is believed to be an Aboriginal word, meaning land of cloud.

References 

Mackay Region
Localities in Queensland